This is a list of book series published by the publisher John Wiley & Sons, Inc., Wiley.

List
 Advanced Micro and Nanosystems
 Advances in Chemical Physics
 Advances in Electrochemical Sciences and Engineering
 Advances in Enzymology - and Related Areas of Molecular Biology
 Advances in Photochemistry
 AGU Reference Shelf
 Analytical Techniques in the Sciences
 Antarctic Research Series
 Ceramic Engineering and Science Proceedings
 Ceramic Transactions Series
 Chemistry of Heterocyclic Compounds: A Series Of Monographs
 Coastal and Estuarine Sciences
 Coastal and Estuarine Studies
 Collected Reprint Series
 Communicating Science in Times of Crisis
 Compendium of Organic Synthetic Methods
 Computational Seismology and Geodynamics
 Field Trip Guidebooks
 Fossils and Strata Series
 Geodynamics Series
 Geophysical Monograph Series
 Global Geoscience Transects
 Health Care and Disease Management
 History of Geophysics
 Inorganic Reactions and Methods
 Inorganic Syntheses
 Lecture Notes on Coastal and Estuarine Studies
 Major Reference Works
 Maurice Ewing Series
 Methods and Principles in Medicinal Chemistry
 Methods of Biochemical Analysis
 Novartis Foundation Symposia
 Organic Reaction Mechanisms Series
 PATAI'S Chemistry of Functional Groups
 Perspectives in Supramolecular Chemistry
 Progress in Inorganic Chemistry
 Progress in Physical Organic Chemistry
 Reviews in Computational Chemistry
 Short Courses in Geology
 Special Publications
 Topics in Stereochemistry
 Total Synthesis of Natural Products
 Water Quality Measurements
 Water Resources Monograph
 Water Science and Application
 Wiley Series in Probability and Statistics
 Wiley-VCH-Lehrbuchkollektion 1
 Wiley-VCH-Lehrbuchkollektion 2

External links
 Publications